Jolgeh Shoqan District is a district (bakhsh) in Jajrom County, North Khorasan Province, Iran. At the 2006 census, its population was 9,847, in 2,728 families.  The District has one city: Shoqan. The district has two rural districts (dehestan): Shoqan Rural District and Tabar Rural District.

References 

Districts of North Khorasan Province
Jajrom County